Amorphophallus margaritifer is a species of plant in the arum family Araceae, native from India to Myanmar.

Description
Amorphophallus margaritifer is an annual herbaceous plant.

Distribution and habitat
Amorphophallus margaritifer is native to India, the region of Assam, Bangladesh, East Himalaya and Myanmar. In Bangladesh, it is recorded growing in moist shady places, often next to agricultural land.

Uses
The peduncles are used as a vegetable.

References

margaritifer
Flora of Assam (region)
Flora of Bangladesh
Flora of East Himalaya
Flora of India (region)
Flora of Myanmar